The 1992–93 St. John's Redmen basketball team represented St. John's University during the 1992–93 NCAA Division- basketball season. The team was coached by Brian Mahoney in his first year at the school after replacing long time head coach Lou Carnesecca. St. John's home games are played at Alumni Hall and Madison Square Garden and the team is a member of the Big East Conference.

Off season

Departures

Class of 1992 signees

Roster

Schedule and results 

|-
!colspan=9 style="background:#FF0000; color:#FFFFFF;"| Regular season

|-
!colspan=9 style="background:#FF0000; color:#FFFFFF;"| Big East tournament

|-
!colspan=9 style="background:#FF0000; color:#FFFFFF;"| NCAA tournament

References 

St. John's Red Storm men's basketball seasons
St. John's
St. John's
St John
St John